Anand Karaj is the Sikh marriage ceremony, meaning "Act towards happiness" or "Act towards happy life", that was introduced by Guru Amar Das. The four laavaan (hymns which take place during the ceremony) were composed by his successor, Guru Ram Das. It was originally legalised in India through the passage of the Anand Marriage Act of 1909, but is now governed by the Sikh Reht Maryada (Sikh code of conduct and conventions) that was issued by the Shiromani Gurdwara Prabandhak Committee (SGPC).

In a recent verdict of the Sri Akal Takht Sahib, a Hukamnama, Anand Karaj can only take place in a Gurdwara (Sikh temple). Any Amritdhari (baptized) Sikh may perform the marriage ceremony.

In 2012, India passed The Anand Marriage (Amendment) Bill, after which Sikhs are able to register their marriages under the Anand Karaj Marriage Act instead of the Hindu Marriage Act, with President Pratibha Devi Singh Patil giving her assent to a bill passed by Parliament on 7 June 2012 in the budget session.

Pakistan declared that it would pass the Sikh Anand Marriage Act in 2007 and a Draft was prepared. In 2018, Pakistani's Punjab Provincial Assembly passed the Punjab Sikh Anand Karaj Marriage Act 2018.

History of Anand Karaj

The history of the Anand marriage ceremony is traced back to the time of Guru Amar Das (1479–1574), who composed the long 40-stanza hymn "Anand", in the Ramkali measure, suitable to be sung or recited on all occasions of religious importance. His successor, Guru Ram Das, composed a four-stanza hymn, "Lavan", which is recited and sung to solemnize nuptials. During the time of Maharaja Ranjit Singh and his successors, however, this ceremony fell into partial disuse under the renewed Brahmanical influence at court as well as in society.

The Nirankari reform movement of the mid-19th century made the practice of Anand ceremony a vital plank in its programme as did the later, more widely influential Singh Sabha. But there was opposition from the Arya Samajis and priestly classes; the former due to their position that Sikh faith was a sect within the larger umbrella of Hinduism and hence subject to Hindu Marriage Act. The Sikh form of wedding ceremonial eventually received legal sanction through the Anand Marriage Act which was adopted in 1909.

The core of the Anand Karaj (the 'blissful ceremony') is the 'lavan', wherein shabads are sung with the bride and groom circumambulating the Guru Granth Sahib. The ceremony serves to provide  the foundational principles towards a successful marriage and also places the marriage within the context of unity with God. Guru Ram Das composed the four stanzas of Lavan to be sung and recited as the core of the Anand Karaj.

In 1579, the fifth Guru, Guru Arjan and Mata Ganga were the first couple to be married through the Anand Karaj ceremony.

The ceremony is now universally observed by the Sikhs.

The Anand Marriage (Amendment) Act, 2012 (India)
The Assent of the President of India was received to the Anand Marriage Amendment Act 2012 on 7 June 2012. The Act paved the way for the validation of Sikh traditional marriages, amending the Anand Marriage Act of 1909, thus providing for compulsory registration of "Anand Karaj" marriages.

 According to the amendment bill, couples whose marriages have been registered under this act will not be required to get their marriage registered under the Registration of Births, Marriages and Deaths Act, 1969, or any other law for the time being in force. Anand Karaj is not recognized in the UK, and a legal English marriage is mandatory.

Punjab Sikh Anand Karaj Marriage Act 2018 (Pakistan)

In 2018, Pakistani's Punjab Provincial Assembly passed the Punjab Sikh Anand Karaj Marriage Act 2018.

Anand Karaj of a Sikh with a non-Sikh
In 2014 the Sikh Council in UK developed a consistent approach towards Anand Karaj in Gurdwaras where one partner is not of Sikh origin, following a two-year consultation with Gurdwara Sahib Committees, Sikh Organisations and individuals. The resulting guidelines were approved by the General Assembly of Sikh Council UK on 11 October 2014, and state that Gurdwaras are encouraged to ensure that both parties to an Anand Karaj wedding are Sikhs, but that where a couple chooses to undertake a civil marriage they should be offered the opportunity to hold an Ardas, Sukhmani Sahib Path, Akhand Path, or other service to celebrate their marriage in the presence of family and friends. Some gurdwaras permit Anand Karaj of non-Sikhs, which has led to controversy.

Married life 

Sikhs practise monogamy in marriage. Husband and wife are seen as being equal.  Any Sikh widow or widower is allowed to marry another person (this also includes divorcees).

See also
 Special Marriage Act, 1954
 Uniform civil code of India
 The Muslim Women (Protection of Rights on Divorce) Act 1986

References 

Sikh Wedding Customs & Traditions In Detail==External links==
  Anank Karaj (Laavan Lyrics in Punjabi, Hindi and English)
  THE ANAND MARRIAGE (AMENDMENT) BILL, 2012 
 Anand Karaj - Marriage
 After The Anand Karaj
 Sikh Marriage by Gurmukh Singh
 Anand Karaj - A Union of Two Souls
 About Anand Karaj in UK
 Teja Singh Mangat, The Sikh Marriage Ceremony, The Sikh Missionary Society UK (Publishers), Fourth edition, 1991 
 www.bbc.co.uk/religion/religions/sikhism/ritesrituals/weddings.shtml (article written by Gurmukh Singh)

Sikh practices
Indian wedding
Weddings by religion
Sikh terminology
Marriage and religion